Brandon Simpson (born 6 September 1981 in Florida, U.S.) is a sprinter who represents Bahrain, having previously represented Jamaica. He has won a bronze medal in 4 x 400 metres relay at three world championships; 2001, 2003 and 2005. He finished 6th in the individual 400 metres contest in 2005, and 5th at the 2004 Olympics.

Achievements

Personal bests
400 metres - 44.64 s (2006)

References

External links

1981 births
Living people
Jamaican male sprinters
Bahraini male sprinters
Athletes (track and field) at the 2004 Summer Olympics
Olympic athletes of Jamaica
Asian Games medalists in athletics (track and field)
World Athletics Championships medalists
Athletes (track and field) at the 2006 Asian Games
Asian Games silver medalists for Bahrain
Medalists at the 2006 Asian Games